Ila is a city in Madison County, Georgia, United States. The population was 350 at the 2020 census.

History
The Georgia General Assembly incorporated the Town of Ila in 1910. Ila is a name derived from the Choctaw language meaning "dead".

Geography
Ila is located in northwestern Madison County at  (34.173692, -83.292706). The city is concentrated around the intersection of Georgia State Route 98 and Georgia State Route 106. SR 106 leads south-southwest  to Athens and north-northeast  to Carnesville, while SR 98 leads west-northwest  to Commerce and southeast  to Danielsville, the Madison county seat.

Ila sits on a ridge between the South Fork of the Broad River to the south and its tributary, Furnace Creek, to the northeast. The city is part of the Savannah River watershed.

Demographics

As of the census of 2000, there were 328 people, 137 households, and 86 families residing in the city. The racial makeup of the city was 97.26% White, 2.13% African American, and 0.61% from two or more races. Hispanic or Latino of any race were 0.30% of the population.

There were 137 households, out of which 27.0% had children under the age of 18 living with them, 49.6% were married couples living together, 6.6% had a female householder with no husband present, and 37.2% were non-families. 29.9% of all households were made up of individuals, and 13.9% had someone living alone who was 65 years of age or older.  The average household size was 2.39 and the average family size was 3.03.

In the city, the population was spread out, with 22.9% under the age of 18, 7.6% from 18 to 24, 29.0% from 25 to 44, 28.4% from 45 to 64, and 12.2% who were 65 years of age or older.  The median age was 39 years. For every 100 females, there were 97.6 males.  For every 100 females age 18 and over, there were 94.6 males.

The median income for a household in the city was $41,250, and the median income for a family was $44,583. Males had a median income of $31,875 versus $24,167 for females. The per capita income for the city was $16,890.  About 11.6% of families and 14.6% of the population were below the poverty line, including 22.2% of those under age 18 and 15.2% of those age 65 or over.

References

Cities in Georgia (U.S. state)
Cities in Madison County, Georgia
Athens – Clarke County metropolitan area
Populated places established in 1910